Jack Traynor may refer to:

 John Traynor (Royal Marine), paralysed Royal Marine cured by a miracle at Lourdes
 Jack Traynor (soccer) (born 1987), American soccer player

See also
John Traynor (disambiguation)